Zbigniew Kaczmarek (born 1 June 1962 in Lębork) is a former Polish football player. He played 30 times for Poland.

References

Sources

 

1962 births
Living people
People from Lębork
Polish footballers
Poland youth international footballers
Poland international footballers
Legia Warsaw players
AJ Auxerre players
En Avant Guingamp players
AC Ajaccio players
Polonia Gdańsk players
Lechia Gdańsk players
Ekstraklasa players
Ligue 1 players
Ligue 2 players
Polish expatriate footballers
Expatriate footballers in France
Sportspeople from Pomeranian Voivodeship
Association football midfielders
Wigry Suwałki managers
Olimpia Zambrów managers
Polish football managers